Bonne nuit les petits is a puppet television series which ran for between 1962-1973, created by Claude Laydu. It had a revival series that aired from 1994-1997.

References

External links
Official site

1962 French television series debuts
1973 French television series endings
France Télévisions original programming
French television shows featuring puppetry
Television shows featuring puppetry
Office de Radiodiffusion Télévision Française original programming